The following lists events that happened in 2013 in El Salvador.

Incumbents
President: Mauricio Funes
Vice President: Salvador Sánchez Cerén

Events

References

 
2010s in El Salvador
Years of the 21st century in El Salvador
El Salvador
El Salvador